Artgal, Arthal, or Arthgal may refer to:

Artgal mac Cathail (died 791), King of Connacht
Arthgal ap Dyfnwal (died 872), King of Alt Clut